Cheap Kisses is a 1924 American silent drama film starring Jean Hersholt as a famous sculptor.  This was the first film made by screenwriter C. Gardner Sullivan through his new production company, C. Gardner Sullivan Productions.  Sullivan also wrote the screenplay. The film was described as "a virile, fast-moving, jazzy story of the present day and age. It shows the peril to the youth of the land along the cocktail, petting-party route."

Plot
As described in a review in a film magazine, Donald Dillingham (Landis) marries a chorus girl, Ardell Kendall (Rich), and his wealthy family turn him down, but when they learn that the celebrated sculptor, 
Gustaf Borgstrom (Hersholt), who is being lionized by society, has selected Ardell as the most beautiful American woman, they call on Donald and insist that he and Ardell and Borgstrom visit their big estate. Among the jazzy crowd present is an adventuress, Maybelle Westcott (Eyton), and Donald falls for her. Ardell, using as a lever his father's infatuation for a showgirl, gets money from him and then buys Maybelle off and exposes her when she does not live up to her bargain. Donald resents her attitude and she leaves him. Returning to their home she finds Donald, contrite, is already there and she forgives him.

Cast

Preservation
With no prints of Cheap Kisses located in any film archives, it is a lost film.

References

External links

Still at silenthollywood.com

1924 films
American silent feature films
American black-and-white films
1924 drama films
Silent American drama films
Film Booking Offices of America films
1920s American films